Milica Vulić (born 27 January 1996) is a Montenegrin footballer who plays as a midfielder and has appeared for the Montenegro women's national team.

Career
Vulić has been capped for the Montenegro national team, appearing for the team during the 2019 FIFA Women's World Cup qualifying cycle.

References

External links
 
 
 

1996 births
Living people
Montenegrin women's footballers
Montenegro women's international footballers
Women's association football midfielders
KFF Vllaznia Shkodër players